Rodney J. Anderson  (born 15 April 1935) is a Canadian poet, musician and Chartered Accountant. After spending decades living in Toronto, he currently lives in Cobourg, Ontario with his wife, Merike Lugus.

Born in Toronto, Ontario, Rod Anderson graduated from the University of Toronto in 1956 with a Chemistry degree. In 1959, he would be designated a Chartered Accountant. After a career in accounting he turned to poetry and eventually music composition. In 1988 he won in the poetry category in a competition by Cross-Canada Writers' Quarterly.  His poems have been anthologized in The Antigonish Review, Contemporary Verse 2, Cross-Canada Writers' Magazine, DIS-EASE, Fiddlehead, Germination, Grain, Implosion, Matrix, Museletter, Poetry Canada Review, Poetry Toronto, Quarry Magazine, Toronto Life, The Toronto Sun, Waves, and Zymergy  and in three anthologies: Garden Varieties, The Dry Wells of India, and More Garden Varieties. He has written two opera librettos for the Canadian Opera Company, including Dulcitius, performed by the COC ensemble in 1988 and a three-act opera Mario and the Magician, with music by Harry Somers performed at the Elgin Theatre, Toronto in 1992. Rod is a member of the Canadian League of Poets.

Works
 1966: Analytical Auditing (co-author with R.M. Skinner; Pitman)
 1977: The External Audit (Pitman) 
 1979: Dollar-Unit Sampling (co-author with Donald A. Lselie, Albert D. Teitlebaum; Copp Clark), 
 1989: Sky Falling Sunny Tomorrow,  (Wolsak and Wynn)

Journal articles
Discussion of Considerations in Choosing Statistical Sampling Procedures in Auditing. R. J. Anderson, Donald A. Leslie. Journal of Accounting Research, Vol. 13, Studies on Statistical Methodology in Auditing (1975), pp. 53–64

See also

Canadian literature
Canadian poetry
List of Canadian poets
List of Canadian writers

References

 
Canadian Literature, Issue No. 129, Summer, 1991 – Review by Bert Almon of Sky Falling Sunny Tomorrow (review not available online, but see the issue's table of contents at http://www.canlit.ca/archive/archive1959-1999/cl_129.html )

External links
Rod Anderson official website
League of Canadian Poets: Rod Anderson profile

1935 births
Living people
20th-century Canadian poets
20th-century Canadian male writers
Canadian accountants
Canadian male poets
People from Cobourg
Writers from Toronto
University of Toronto alumni